Lyons is an unincorporated community located within Bernards Township, in Somerset County, New Jersey, United States. As of the 2010 United States Census, the population was 228. Lyons has a post office with ZIP code 07939.

Demographics

Economy
The Lyons VA Medical Center is a U. S. Department of Veterans Affairs hospital located here.
38 buildings, containing neuropsychiatric patients resided here in 1931. In 2018, it employed 60 physicians.

Population

Transportation
The community is served by New Jersey Transit train service at the Lyons station on the Gladstone Branch to Newark Broad Street Station and Hoboken Terminal.

History
 The area called Lyons is remembered for the David Lyon farm which was a large part of the area.
 Lyons Depot - This one-story Tudor Revival and Mission Revival style structure was built in 1931. It is faced with stucco and brick and has limestone trim with carved rosette ornamentation at the gable ends. It was designed by Delaware Lackawanna and Western Railroad (DL&W) architect D.T. Mack or one of his staff. It was built largely to accommodate the growing number of visitors to Veterans Hospital. It was the last station built on the Gladstone Branch. Is now owned by Bernards Township.
 Lyons Train Station state and national historic registry - NR 6-22-84 SR 3-17-84
 Groundbreaking started on the Lyons VA Hospital on July 11, 1929.
 The first patients arrived at the Lyons facility on November 12, 1930, having been transferred from the Bronx VA Hospital in New York City. By July 1931 a total of 415 patients were living and receiving therapy at the hospital. 
 Hospital dedicated Saturday, July 23, 1931.
 The Lyons VA Medical Center was the only VA hospital in the state until one in East Orange opened in 1952. It was listed on the NRHP as the Lyons Veterans Administration Hospital Historic District in 2013.
 There is a Lyons Fire Department and it's on the grounds of the Lyons VA.
 Local historian Brooks Betz noted that the population growth of Bernards Township exploded over the next two decades due to people moving to the area to support the Lyons VA.

References

External links

 The Lyons VA and History of Lyons area- Mr Local History Project
 History research of the Lyons Hamlet of Bernards Township - Mr Local History Project

Bernards Township, New Jersey
Unincorporated communities in Somerset County, New Jersey
Unincorporated communities in New Jersey